Nomakanjani is the fourteenth studio album by South African singer Brenda Fassie, released on 15 November  1999 by CCP Records and EMI Records.the production of Nomakanjani incorporated the use of kwaito elements and Afropop. On the project Brenda Fassie worked with her long time producer Sello "Chicco" Twala and T. Dhladhla.

The album was a massive commercial success, it sold 525 000 copies in South Africa and it was certified 11x Platinum by the Recording Industry of South Africa (Risa). Nomakanjani received the best-selling album award and Song of the Year at the South African Music Awards.

Track listing

"Soon And Very Soon" is written by Andraé Crouch and performed by Andraé Crouch.

Certifications

Accolades

Personnel

Credit from  AllMusic

Brenda Fassie - Composer, Primary Artist
Sello "Chicco" Twala - Arranger, Composer, Engineer, Producer
T. Dhladhla - Engineer
Mark Morrison - Photography

References

External links
Nomakanjani?

1999 albums
Brenda Fassie albums